CUC (Comp-U-Card) International Inc. was a membership-based consumer services conglomerate with travel, shopping, auto, dining, home improvement and financial services offered to more than 60 million customers worldwide based in Stamford, Connecticut, USA, and founded in 1973 by Kirk Shelton and Walter Forbes. In 1998, it became involved in a Securities and Exchange Commission investigation into what, at the time, was the biggest accounting scandal in corporate history.

History 
Their main product, a shopping service, originally a membership telephone-based drop-ship service called Comp-U-Card begun in 1973, was made available online to users of The Source in the mid-1980s, and later CompuServe after its purchase of The Source. It later offered its Shoppers Advantage service on America Online, Prodigy, GEnie and Delphi as well. It was perhaps the first company conducting electronic commerce, although its web based service first went online in 1995.

CUC's main line of operations was its mail-order clubs such as Shopper’s Advantage, AutoVantage, Traveler’s Advantage and its Comp-U-Card program, and it had been trying to find a way to streamline its clubs and sell retail through a kind of interactive television. In an age before the internet and sites such as Amazon.com, this idea was innovative.

CUC went through various company presidents and lost a lot of money during the 1970s. By 1979, it was losing more than $2 million a year. By 1983, Forbes and his company had found investors such as Reader's Digest and Eckerd Drugs but had lost nearly $14 million. After licensing their "interactive shopping" idea in Europe, the Morgan Stanley group took CUC public in the United States in 1983 and raised $20 million.

During the 1980s and early 1990s, CUC continued to grow and acquire other companies. It made strategic deals with other entertainment, communication, retail and investment companies such as America Online and AT&T. and grew to have over 30 million customers via its mail order clubs. CUC did not make any large acquisitions until 1995. Before that time, all acquisitions were relatively small and strategic.

In February 1996, seeking to expand its operations into the field of interactive entertainment, CUC approached the software companies Sierra On-Line Inc. and Davidson & Associates Inc. It bought Sierra for $1.5 billion and Davidson for $1.6 billion, both in stock. These acquisitions allowed CUC, as a larger outlet, to streamline its distribution network. In addition, product placements and advertisements in these software companies' products allowed CUC to find new customers in demographics it had not previously reached.

In December 1997, CUC merged with HFS Incorporated. A competition was held internally at CUC, primarily among its senior marketing staff but open to all employees, to come up with a new corporate name. The winner was to receive dinner "anywhere in the world". No employee submission was selected to win, as the name of the company had already been decided. The new company was named Cendant. After the merger, Cendant retained its core business as a direct marketer and thereafter also specialized in hotel franchises, car rentals, travel agencies and its consumer software operations, Cendant Software. The merger of these two companies, which between them owned "a virtual monopoly in the worldwide market for full-service timeshare exchange services" according to the Federal Trade Commission, caused the FTC to require "the parties to divest one of their timeshare exchange companies to re-establish a viable competitor in the market".

Cendant Software, composed of Sierra, Davidson & Associates (including Blizzard Entertainment), Knowledge Adventure and Gryphon Software, was sold in 1998 to the French publisher Havas, which then merged with Vivendi, which then merged with Activision.

After the accounting scandal, the original Comp-U-Card division was bought out by some remaining executives and reorganized into a company called Trilegiant. It was later renamed Affinion Group and is still located in Stamford, Connecticut.

On October 23, 2005, Cendant Corporation announced its decision to split into four separate companies: Realogy, Travelport, Wyndham Worldwide and Avis Budget Group."

Accounting scandal 
On April 16, 1998, less than one year after the new brand was introduced, Cendant disclosed that for three years prior to the merger, CUC had fraudulently overstated its income by over US$500 million. This caused Cendant stock to plummet from $39 to $20 in a single day, eventually reaching $9, and costing shareholders about US$14 billion. Cendant/CUC was eventually required to pay more than US$2.85 billion in class action settlements to shareholders.

The Securities and Exchange Commission brought civil charges against CUC's president Kirk Shelton and CEO and chairman Walter Forbes, for the "long-running financial fraud" which, it alleged, started in 1995. The SEC stated that CUC inflated its books in order to inflate its stock price, which allowed it to use its stock to buy other companies, and in turn these mergers and acquisitions were executed in order to generate financial reserves and purchase reserves that were intended to be "big enough to bury the fraud".

Shelton was convicted in January 2005 of 12 counts of fraud and related charges and sentenced to 10 years in prison. Shelton and Forbes were tried together. Although Shelton was convicted of all 12 charges brought, the jury was unable to reach a verdict for Forbes on any charge. A hung jury also deadlocked Forbes' second trial and a third trial was set for September 2006. Retried and convicted, he was sentenced to 12 years on January 17, 2007. The former CUC chief financial officer Cosmo Corigliano, former comptroller Anne Pember and former accountant Casper Sabatino all pleaded guilty in June 2000 to several fraud and related charges.

In addition to their prison terms, Shelton and Forbes were each ordered to pay Cendant US$3.275 billion in restitution. Cendant is unlikely to ever receive the full amount, as according to the payment schedule of US$2,000 per month ordered by the judge, it would take over 134,000 years to pay.

Investigators found that over US$500 million in non-existent company income had been reported during 1996 and 1997. Membership sales revenue had been overreported and membership cancellations information held back, allowing for the company's earnings to be manipulated at will. With too much debt and too little real income, however, the real resources of the company were dwindling, despite the considerable flotation of the stock numbers. As the imaginary books and the real company finances diverged more and more, the requirements of appearances became greater. Even the cooked books were insufficient to cover all of the company's losses, at which time it turned to mergers with, and acquisition of, new companies. Purchased companies' assets could be similarly inflated, and the increase either boost operating income or write off losses. The misreporting of assets by CUC from 1995 to 1997 is similar to that performed during the Enron scandal and other more recent frauds.

See also 
 Affinion Group, formerly Trilegiant
 Worldcom scandal

References 

Corporate scandals
Corporate crime
1998 crimes in the United States
Accounting scandals
Fraud